The 2000 XXXVI FIBA International Christmas Tournament "Trofeo Raimundo Saporta-Memorial Fernando Martín" was the 36th edition of the FIBA International Christmas Tournament. It took place at Raimundo Saporta Pavilion, Madrid, Spain, on 25 December 2000 with the participations of Real Madrid Teka (champions of the 1999–2000 Liga ACB) and São Paulo All-Stars.

Final

December 25, 2000

|}

References

FIBA International Christmas Tournament
2000–01 in European basketball
2000–01 in Spanish basketball